VDE may refer to:

Science and technology
 Virtual Distributed Ethernet, a virtualised network infrastructure
 Violaxanthin de-epoxidase, an enzyme
 Visteon Dockable Entertainment, a portable DVD player with Game Boy Advance slot

Other uses
 VDE e.V. (Verband der Elektrotechnik, Elektronik und Informationstechnik), a German technical association
 German Unification Transport Projects (German initials "VDE"), transportation infrastructure projects